Carl Mullins (6 March 1925 – 26 October 1999) was a Barbadian cricketer. He played in three first-class matches for the Barbados cricket team from 1950 to 1954.

See also
 List of Barbadian representative cricketers

References

External links
 

1925 births
1999 deaths
Barbadian cricketers
Barbados cricketers
People from Saint Michael, Barbados